Raymond Blackhall (born 19 February 1957) is an English former professional footballer who played in the Football League for Carlisle United, Mansfield Town, Newcastle United and Sheffield Wednesday.

References

1957 births
Living people
English footballers
Association football defenders
English Football League players
Newcastle United F.C. players
Sheffield Wednesday F.C. players
Mansfield Town F.C. players
Carlisle United F.C. players
Blyth Spartans A.F.C. players
English expatriate footballers
Expatriate footballers in Sweden
English expatriate sportspeople in Sweden